The coat of arms of the Governor-in-chief of the British Windward Islands was adopted in 1886.

See also
Flag of the British Windward Islands
Coat of arms of the British Leeward Islands

External links

Hubert de Vries: National Arms and Emblems Past and Present – Windward Islands

Coat of arms
Windward
Windward
Windward
British Windward Islands